Serge Charles N'Gal (born 13 January 1986) is a Cameroonian former professional footballer who played as a forward.

Club career
Born in Nkongsamba, N'Gal started his professional career in Spain with Villarreal CF at the age of 17, but could not find a place in the first team. In 2004, he moved to FC Inter Turku in the Finnish Veikkausliiga, as he had visited the country before when representing Cameroon in the 2003 FIFA U-17 World Championship. His first season was not a success due to an injury, as he managed to play only six games and score two goals.

In his second year, N'Gal was among the top players in the league, and his impressive performances attracted interest from bigger European clubs. Midway through the 2005–06 campaign, he signed with French second level side Stade Brestois 29 but, after an unsuccessful stint, joined Portuguese Primeira Liga's U.D. Leiria.

In May 2008, N'Gal stated that S.L. Benfica and Deportivo de La Coruña had shown interested in him. In August, after Leiria's relegation, he moved back to Spain and signed a two-year contract with Gimnàstic de Tarragona, in division two.

After a poor second season with the Catalans – 19 matches, no goals– N'Gal returned to União de Leiria. On 15 January 2012, he signed an 18-month contract with Algerian Ligue Professionnelle 1 club USM Alger, being released four months later.

International career
N'Gal represented Cameroon at the 2008 Summer Olympics, appearing in four games in an eventual quarter-final exit.

References

External links

Football-Lineups profile

1986 births
Living people
Cameroonian footballers
Association football forwards
Segunda División players
Segunda División B players
Villarreal CF B players
Gimnàstic de Tarragona footballers
La Roda CF players
Veikkausliiga players
FC Inter Turku players
Ligue 2 players
Stade Brestois 29 players
Primeira Liga players
U.D. Leiria players
Associação Académica de Coimbra – O.A.F. players
Algerian Ligue Professionnelle 1 players
USM Alger players
Olympic footballers of Cameroon
Footballers at the 2008 Summer Olympics
Cameroonian expatriate footballers
Expatriate footballers in Spain
Expatriate footballers in Finland
Expatriate footballers in France
Expatriate footballers in Portugal
Expatriate footballers in Algeria
Cameroonian expatriate sportspeople in Spain
Cameroonian expatriate sportspeople in Finland
Cameroonian expatriate sportspeople in France
Cameroonian expatriate sportspeople in Portugal
Cameroonian expatriate sportspeople in Algeria